Chuck Eddy (born November 26, 1960) is an American music journalist.

Life and career
Chuck Eddy was born in Detroit, Michigan. After starting his journalism career with The Village Voice and Creem, where he published one of the first national interviews with the Beastie Boys in the mid-1980s, Eddy then wrote for Rolling Stone, Spin, Entertainment Weekly and other national and local publications. He has authored four books: Stairway to Hell: The 500 Best Heavy Metal Albums in the Universe, The Accidental Evolution of Rock and Roll, Rock and Roll Always Forgets: A Quarter Century of Music Criticism, and Terminated for Reasons of Taste: Other Ways to Hear Essential and Inessential Music.

In 1999 he was hired as the music editor at The Village Voice, where he served for seven years. After being terminated on grounds of "taste" upon Village Voice Media's merger with New Times in 2006, he briefly wrote a thrice-weekly heavy metal blog for MTV's URGE and a monthly page of capsule CD reviews in Harp called "The Last Roundup". From 2006 to 2007, he worked as a senior editor for Billboard magazine. Eddy currently freelances from Austin, Texas. 

He has published book chapters in several anthologies, including The Rolling Stone Illustrated History of Rock and Roll (Random House, 1992); Spin Alternative Record Guide (Vintage, 1995); Stars Don’t Stand Still in the Sky: Music And Myth (NYU Press, 1999); Bubblegum Music Is the Naked Truth (Feral House, 2001); Creem: America’s Only Rock ‘N’ Roll Magazine (Collins, 2007); and 1000 Songs To Change Your Life (Time Out, 2008.)

References

External links
 Eliminated for Reasons of Space: Chuck Eddy's blog
 Chuck It All In: Rhapsody blog
 Singles Again: Blurt blog
 Entertainment Weekly reviews
 Harp reviews
 Spin reviews
 Singles Jukebox reviews
 Rolling Stone Songs of the Day
 Podcast on Rolling Stone record guides, Part 1
 Chuck Eddy articles archived at Rock's Back Pages

Selected articles
 Final Word: Best Singles Of The '80s
 Michael Jackson essay, 1991
Talk Eddy to Me - The World's Most Iconoclastic Rock Critic Speaks Out, By Scott Woods
 Chuck E...So Addictive, By Steven Ward

American music journalists
Living people
1960 births
Writers from Detroit
American male journalists
Journalists from Michigan
The Village Voice people
Rolling Stone people